The Italian Union of Food Industry Workers (UILIA) was a trade union representing workers in the food and drink industry in Italy.

The union was founded in 1950, and held its founding conference in 1953.  It was a founding affiliate of the Italian Labour Union.  By 1964, the union had 42,241 members.  In 1994, it merged with the Italian Union of Food Industry Workers, to form the Italian Union of Agricultural and Food Workers.

References

Food processing trade unions
Trade unions established in 1950
Trade unions disestablished in 1994
Trade unions in Italy